Carlos Fernández Valdovinos (born February 9, 1965, in Asunción, Paraguay) is a Paraguayan economist. Between October 2013 and August 2018 he was the president of the Central Bank of Paraguay.

Education  
Fernández Valdovinos earned his degree in economics from Universidad Federal de Paraná in 1990. He received his M.Sc. in economics from the University of Illinois at Urbana–Champaign in 1994, and his Ph.D. in economics from University of Chicago in 1999, with the presentation of the doctoral thesis "Inflation and welfare in an endogenously growing economy". Robert E. Lucas (Chairman), Larry Sjaastad, and Fernando Alvarez served as members of the evaluation committee.

Career 
Fernández Valdovinos began his career at the Central Bank of Paraguay as the Section Head for Monetary Programming in 1991–1992. He served as an advisor for the managing director of the Economic Research Division in 1999–2001, and was later appointed managing director of the same division in 2001 and served until 2004.

Beginning in 2004, Fernández Valdovinos transferred to the World Bank headquarters in Washington, D.C., where he served as senior economist covering Argentina until 2006. Later, he served in the International Monetary Fund (IMF) as senior economist covering the EMEA region from 2006 to 2011. Furthermore, he served as the IMF Resident Representative in Bolivia and Brazil.

On October 3, 2013, Fernández Valdovinos was nominated to replace Jorge Corvalan as president of the Central Bank of Paraguay, until August 2018.

In October 2018, he was appointed to the Board of Directors of Banco Basa.

In the academic field, Fernández Valdovinos was a professor at the Universidad Nacional de Asunción and Universidad Católica Nuestra Señora de la Asunción. He has also lectured at Georgetown University and the University of Chicago, with the doctoral thesis "Inflation and welfare in an endogenously growing economy".

Honors and awards 
 Central Bank Governor of the Year 2018 - Central Banking
Central Bank Governor of the Year 2017 - Central Banking 
 Central Banker of the Year, Americas 2017 – The Banker 
 Best Central Banker 2016 – Global Finance
 Best Central Banker 2015 – Global Finance

Publications
 Año nuevo, mundo nuevo (2019)
¿Quo vadis, Paraguay? (2018)
Las cuatro C de los Bancos Centrales (2018)
La revolución Fintech (2018)
En busca de la IED perdida (2017)
Paraguay: Regulator Statement (2016)
 Paraguay: Más allá de la Estabilidad Macroeconómica. Logros y desafíos (2016)  
 Darwin y las especies (2015)  
 Paraguay: Central Bank Statement (2015)  
 No se construye en días de lluvia (2015) 
 La hormiga y las cigarras (2014) 
 ¿Estamos listos? (2014) 
 El Guaraní 70 años de Estabilidad. Una Conquista de la Sociedad (2013)
 Inflation Uncertainty and Relative Price Variability in WAEMU Countries (2011) Fondo Monetario Internacional Working Paper No. 11/59
 Economic Growth in Paraguay - Coautor (2006)
 Further evidence on Friedman's hypothesis: The case of Paraguay December (2001) Cuadernos de Economía, No. 115. Pontificia Universidad Católica de Chile.
 Inflation and economic growth in the long run 16 (2003). Economics Letters Elsevier-North Holland, Vol. 80, No. 2, pp. 167–173.

References

External links 
 Banco Central del Paraguay
 Presidentes del Banco Central del Paraguay

1965 births
Living people
Paraguayan economists
Presidents of the Central Bank of Paraguay
University of Chicago alumni
University of Illinois Urbana-Champaign alumni
Economy of Paraguay